Velampoondi is a village located in Tiruppur district in the Indian state of Tamil Nadu.

Villages in Tiruppur district